The Hôtel de Boisgelin is a listed hôtel particulier in Aix-en-Provence.

Location
It is located at number 11 on the rue du Quatre Septembre, on the Place des Quatre Dauphins, in the Quartier Mazarin of Aix-en-Provence.

History
It was designed by architects Pierre Pavillon (1612-1670) and Jean-Claude Rambot (1621-1694), and built for Louis Le Blanc de Montespin in 1650. In 1697, it was purchased by Pierre-Joseph Laurens-Brue. That year, he commissioned architect Laurent Vallon (1652-1724) to design a grand staircase inside. It was later inherited by the Boisgelin family.

It comes with a courtyard and a garden. In the garden, there is a fountain under the foliage, thus always in the shade in daytime.

Heritage significance
It has been listed as a monument historique since 1964.

References

Hôtels particuliers in Aix-en-Provence
Monuments historiques of Aix-en-Provence
Houses completed in 1650
1650 establishments in France